Øyangsvatnet is a lake in the municipality of Orkland in Trøndelag county, Norway. The lake lies in the west central part of Agdenes, just east of the border with Snillfjord municipality.

See also
List of lakes in Norway

References

Orkland
Lakes of Trøndelag